Hafiz Alam Sairani is Vice President of West Bengal State Congress Committee(WBPCC). Sairani joined Indian National Congress on 3rd November 2022 after resigning from all post of All India Forward Bloc. He is former Secretary of All India Forward Bloc  and former Secretariat Member of Left Front State Committee. Hafiz resigned from All India Forward Bloc on 23rd September 2022. He is former Relief and Co-operative Minister of the Left Front government in West Bengal.

A commerce and education graduate, he is a teacher by profession. He was a state secretariat member and central committee member of the Forward Bloc. And also the member of state Left Front.

He was elected MLA from Goalpokhar in 1996 and 2001.

Early life 
Born in 1960 at Binardah, a small village of Uttar Dinajpur. Sairani belongs to a Bengali Muslim family which had produced another famous son, Ex MLA and well known politician Ramzan Ali was his elder brother. His father was also a very well known person in that region and was a landlord. A former student of Chakulia High School, Chakulia, Uttar Dinajpur, Sairani studied Commerce from Calcutta University, Kolkata, and secured his M.A degree, and started working in Chakulia High School as a teacher.

Career 
In 1994, Sairani was elected as a Legislative Assembly Member for the first time. His constituency was Goalpokhar. He was given charge of the Uttar Dinajpur district by the party. He was also given charge of the Relief department of West Bengal Government. Due to his good image he was also given the charge of Cooperative department.

References

All India Forward Bloc politicians
Living people
West Bengal MLAs 1991–1996
West Bengal MLAs 1996–2001
West Bengal MLAs 2001–2006
People from Uttar Dinajpur district
1960 births
20th-century Bengalis
21st-century Bengalis